Connecticut's 32nd State Senate district elects one member of the Connecticut State Senate. It consists of the communities of Bethlehem, Bridgewater, Oxford, Roxbury, Southbury, Washington, Watertown, Woodbury, and parts of Bethel, Brookfield, Middlebury and Seymour. It has been represented by Republican Eric Berthel since 2017.

Recent elections

2020

2018

2017 special

2016

2014

2012

References

32